Sándor Simonyi-Semadam (23 March 1864 – 4 June 1946) was a Hungarian politician who served as prime minister for a few months in 1920. He signed the Treaty of Trianon after World War I on 4 June 1920. By this treaty, Hungary lost a considerable part of its territory. Simonyi was a member of the Hungarian-Nippon Society, a society for creating cultural links between Japan and Hungary. On 4 June 1946, Simonyi-Semadam died at his home in Budapest.

References
 Simonyi-Semadam Sándor – Sulinet.hu
 [ Magyar életrajzi lexikon]

See also
Simonyi

1864 births
1946 deaths
People from Veszprém County
Prime Ministers of Hungary
Hungarian Interior Ministers
Foreign ministers of Hungary
Burials at Farkasréti Cemetery